, son of Fuyuhira, was kugyo or highest-ranking Japanese court noble of the Muromachi period (1336–1573). Fuyunori adopted him as a son.

Morohira held the office of kampaku from 1342 to 1346.

 1342 (Kōei 1, 1st month): The kampaku Ichijō Tsunemichi lost his position; and Morohira took on this role.
 1346 (Jōwa 2, 2nd month):  Morohira was relieved of his duties as kampaku; and he was replaced by Nijō Yoshimoto.

See also
Fuyumichi, Morohira's son.

Notes

References

 Titsingh, Isaac, ed. (1834). [Siyun-sai Rin-siyo/Hayashi Gahō, 1652], Nipon o daï itsi ran; ou,  Annales des empereurs du Japon.  Paris: Oriental Translation Fund of Great Britain and Ireland.  OCLC  84067437

External links
   Takatsukasa

1310 births
1353 deaths
Fujiwara clan
Takatsukasa family
People of Kamakura-period Japan
People of Nanboku-chō-period Japan